The  is a limited-stop "Home Liner"-style service to and from Ikebukuro Station in Tokyo on the Tobu Tojo Line operated by the private railway operator Tobu Railway in Japan since June 2008.

Service outline
In the down direction, a supplement of 310 yen is required for travel from Ikebukuro, but no supplementary fare is required for passengers boarding at other stations along the line. In the up direction, a supplement of 410 yen is required from all stations (310 yen from Fujimino). Seats are not reserved, but the supplementary tickets indicate whether passengers should ride in the front or rear five cars of the train. At Ikebukuro Station, passengers board from platform 5, which is normally used only for passengers alighting from other services.

Weekdays

Weekends
At weekends, nine evening down services (Nos. 1 to 17) operate at half-hourly intervals between 17:00 and 21:00 from Ikebukuro to Ogawamachi.

Station stops
TJ Liner services stop at the following stations.
  -  -  -  -  -  -  -  -  -

Rolling stock
TJ Liner services are operated by a fleet of six 50090 series 10-car electric multiple units (EMUs). These sets are unusual in having rotating pairs of seats allowing them to be used with longitudinal seating on regular daytime services, and with transverse seating on evening TJ Liner services. Some trains are sent to Ikebukuro from Shinrinkōen as limited-stop Rapid Express services, which also operate with seats in the forward-facing configuration.

Since March 2016, the automated on-board passenger announcements in Japanese use the voice of TV presenter .

Formations
TJ Liner trains are formed as shown below, with car 10 at the Ikebukuro end.

Cars 2 and 9 have a wheelchair space. Car 9 is designated as a mildly-air-conditioned car.

History

2008
The name "TJ Liner" was formally announced by Tobu on 28 January 2008 based on the results of a public poll conducted between December 2007 and January 2008. The votes for the three choices of possible names were as follows.
  (4,313 votes)
  (3,148 votes)
 Assist Liner (1,726 votes)

Services commenced from the start of the Tobu Tojo Line timetable revision on 14 June 2008, with six trains on weekdays, and four trains at weekends and holidays. The original timetable was as shown below.

Weekdays
 TJ Liner 1: Ikebukuro (18:00) to Shinrinkōen (18:47)
 TJ Liner 2: Ikebukuro (19:00) to Shinrinkōen (19:47)
 TJ Liner 3: Ikebukuro (20:00) to Shinrinkōen (20:47)
 TJ Liner 4: Ikebukuro (21:00) to Ogawamachi (22:02)
 TJ Liner 5: Ikebukuro (22:00) to Ogawamachi (23:02)
 TJ Liner 6: Ikebukuro (22:50) to Shinrinkōen (23:41)

Weekends
 TJ Liner 1: Ikebukuro (17:00) to Shinrinkōen (17:47)
 TJ Liner 2: Ikebukuro (18:00) to Shinrinkōen (18:47)
 TJ Liner 3: Ikebukuro (19:00) to Ogawamachi (20:02)
 TJ Liner 4: Ikebukuro (20:00) to Ogawamachi (21:02)

2009

From 15 September 2009, a new QR Code ticketing system was introduced for TJ Liner services. From this date, TJ Liner supplementary fare tickets were printed with a QR Code enabling them to be read by special ticket readers at Ikebukuro Station platform gates, replacing the previous manual ticket inspection by staff.

On 5 November 2009, a ceremony was held at Ikebukuro Station to celebrate the one millionth passenger to travel on the TJ Liner service.

2011
From the start of the revised timetable on 5 March 2011, the number of TJ Liner services operating on weekday evenings was increased from six to nine. On weekends, all services were extended to run to Ogawamachi. The timetable operated from March 2011 was as shown below.

Weekdays
 TJ Liner 1: Ikebukuro (18:00) to Shinrinkōen (18:48)
 TJ Liner 2: Ikebukuro (18:30) to Ogawamachi (19:31)
 TJ Liner 3: Ikebukuro (19:00) to Shinrinkōen (19:48)
 TJ Liner 4: Ikebukuro (19:30) to Ogawamachi (20:31)
 TJ Liner 5: Ikebukuro (20:00) to Shinrinkōen (20:48)
 TJ Liner 6: Ikebukuro (20:30) to Ogawamachi (21:32)
 TJ Liner 7: Ikebukuro (21:00) to Ogawamachi (22:02)
 TJ Liner 8: Ikebukuro (22:00) to Ogawamachi (23:02)
 TJ Liner 9: Ikebukuro (22:50) to Shinrinkōen (23:39)
 TJ Liner 10 (TJ Liner 23:10): Ikebukuro (23:20) to Shinrinkoen (00:09)

Weekends
 TJ Liner 1: Ikebukuro (17:00) to Ogawamachi (18:05)
 TJ Liner 2: Ikebukuro (18:00) to Ogawamachi (19:05)
 TJ Liner 3: Ikebukuro (19:00) to Ogawamachi (20:04)
 TJ Liner 4: Ikebukuro (20:00) to Ogawamachi (21:02)

In December 2011, an additional TJ Liner 10, nicknamed TJ Liner 23:10, operated to Shinrinkōen on Thursdays and Fridays from 8 to 22 December (a total of five days), departing from Ikebukuro Station at 23:20, 30 minutes after the last regular TJ Liner service.

2013
From the start of the revised timetable on 16 March 2013, an additional TJ Liner service was added on weekday evenings, departing from Ikebukuro at 21:30, and two more TJ Liner services were added on weekends, departing from Ikebukuro at 18:30 and 19:30. From this date, all TJ Liner services operated to Ogawamachi.

2014
On 22 January 2014, the TJ Liner service celebrated the 5 millionth passenger since the start of services in 2008.

From 1 April 2014, the TJ Liner supplement fare was raised from 300 yen to 310 yen, coinciding with the increase in Japanese consumption tax from 5% to 8%.

From July 2014, an additional late-night TJ Liner service was introduced, operating on Friday nights only, departing Ikebukuro at 23:20 for Shinrinkoen. Initially scheduled to operate until December 2014, it subsequently continued to operate every Friday.

2015
From 7 May 2015, the additional late-night TJ Liner service previously operating on Friday nights only was extended to also run on Thursday nights.

2016

With the start of the revised timetable introduced on 26 March 2016, two weekday morning TJ Liner services were introduced in the up direction from Shinrinkoen to Ikebukuro. From the same date, the number of down services from Ikebukuro was also increased, with services operating at 30-minute intervals between 18:00 and 24:00 on weekdays, and between 17:00 and 21:00 at weekends.

Ridership statistics
In fiscal 2012, TJ Liner services were used by a total of 1,057,662 passengers. Figures for previous years are as shown below.

See also
 TH Liner
 List of named passenger trains of Japan

References

External links

  

Tobu Tojo Main Line
Named passenger trains of Japan
Railway services introduced in 2008
2008 establishments in Japan